The Supermarine P.B.31E Nighthawk was a British aircraft of the First World War and the first project of the Pemberton-Billing operation after it became Supermarine Aviation Works Ltd. It was an anti-Zeppelin night fighter operated by a crew of three to five and had a planned flight endurance of 9–18 hours. The prototype flew in February 1917 with Clifford Prodger at the controls. It proved to not meet the promised specification and no more were built.

Design and development
The Nighthawk had six-bay swept quadraplane wings and a biplane tailplane with twin fins and rudders. The fuselage filled the gap between the second and third wings; the cockpit, which carried up to the top wing "turret", was enclosed and heated.

Along with the intended long endurance, it was suggested it would be able to patrol at low speeds and await the Zeppelin. For armament, it had a trainable nose-mounted searchlight, a 1½-pounder (37 mm) Davis gun mounted above the top wing with 20 shells, and two .303 in (7.7 mm) Lewis guns. Power for the searchlight was provided by an independent petrol engine-driven generator set made by ABC Motors, possibly the first instance of a recognisable airborne auxiliary power unit.

Operational history

Furthermore, given the Anzani engine's reputation for unreliability and overheating, it is unlikely that the aircraft would have delivered the advertised endurance.

Surviving relics

One of the two propellers of the Nighthawk is preserved in Solent Sky, an aviation museum in Southampton, England.

Specifications (prototype)

See also
Robey-Peters Gun-Carrier

References

Notes

Bibliography

 Andrews, C.F. and E.B. Morgan. Supermarine Aircraft since 1914. London: Putnam, 1987. . 
 Bruce, J.M. Warplanes of the First World War, Volume Three: Fighters. London: Macdonald, 1969. . 
 Mason, Francis K. The British Fighter since 1912. Annapolis, Maryland: Naval Institute Press, 1992. .

Cancelled military aircraft projects of the United Kingdom
1910s British fighter aircraft
Quadruplanes
Nighthawk
Twin piston-engined tractor aircraft
Aircraft first flown in 1917